Mike Kleijn (born 9 February 2005) is a Dutch professional footballer who plays as a midfielder for Feyenoord.

Professional career
Kleijn began playing football with the youth side of Baronie, and moved to Feyenoord's youth academy at the age of 6 in 2011. He worked his way up their youth sides, eventually captaining the U18s, and signed his first professional contract with them on 2 November 2020. In September 2022, he was named by English newspaper The Guardian as one of the best players born in 2005 worldwide.

International career
Kleijn is a youth international for the Netherlands, and captained the Netherlands U17s at the 2022 UEFA European Under-17 Championship.

References

External links
 
 
 Ons Oranje O15 profile
 Ons Oranje O17 profile

2005 births
Living people
Footballers from Breda
Dutch footballers
Netherlands youth international footballers
Association football midfielders
Feyenoord players